Juan de Sanclemente Torquemada (19 August 1534 – 20 April 1602) was a Roman Catholic prelate who served as Archbishop of Santiago de Compostela (1587–1602) and Bishop of Ourense (1578–1587).

Biography
Juan de Sanclemente Torquemada was born in Córdoba, Spain. On 7 July 1578, he was appointed during the papacy of Pope Gregory XIII as Bishop of Ourense. On 25 January 1579, he was consecrated bishop by Francisco Blanco Salcedo, Archbishop of Santiago de Compostela, with Fernando Vellosillo Barrio, Bishop of Lugo, and Diego Torquemada, Bishop of Tui, serving as co-consecrators. On 27 July 1587, he was appointed during the papacy of Pope Sixtus V as Archbishop of Santiago de Compostela. He served as Archbishop of Santiago de Compostela until his death on 20 April 1602.

Episcopal succession
While bishop, he was the principal consecrator of Miguel Ares Canaval, Bishop of Orense (1595); Francisco de Tolosa, Bishop of Tui (1597); and Francisco Terrones del Caño, Bishop of Tui (1601).

References

External links and additional sources
 (for Chronology of Bishops) 
 (for Chronology of Bishops) 
 (for Chronology of Bishops) 
 (for Chronology of Bishops) 

16th-century Roman Catholic archbishops in Spain
17th-century Roman Catholic archbishops in Spain
1534 births
1602 deaths
Bishops appointed by Pope Gregory XIII
Bishops appointed by Pope Sixtus V